The taxonomy of the burden of treatment is a visualization created for health care professionals to better comprehend the obstacles that interfere with a patient's health care plan. It was created as a result of a world wide, qualitative-based study that asked adults with chronic conditions to list the personal, environmental, and financial barriers that burden a patient. The purpose of this visualization is to help health care providers develop personalized management strategies that the patient can follow through a narrative paradigm. The goal is to target interventions, achieve an interpersonal doctor-patient relationship, and improve health outcomes.

Patient advocacy 

The increasing autonomy in patients has encouraged them to demand a more patient-centered relationship with their healthcare providers. In the past, patient-doctor relationships have been widely paternalistic. Doctors were very respected for their knowledge and they often withheld information from patients without question. The development of the internet has now given patients the ability to research their health conditions, ask more questions, and want to be a part of the conversation. The shift towards patient advocacy and interpersonal collaboration allows shared trust, respect, and healthcare goals.

Noncommunicable diseases (NCDs) are now the leading cause of death worldwide over communicable diseases.  The 5 leading causes of death in the US in 2017 were all non-communicable diseases: ischemic heart disease, Alzheimer's disease, lung cancer, stroke, and chronic obstructive pulmonary disorder.  NCDs require prolonged management that usually lasts for the rest of a person's life. The risk factors of NCDs are strongly behavioral including poor diet, lack of exercise, and substance use. Because these risk factors are known and controllable, a significant percentage of NCDs are preventable. This classification of diseases require patients to change their lifestyle habits in accordance to their long-term disease. Because of this, patients are expected to play an active role in their healthcare alongside their provider to implement and enforce these lifestyle changes.

The visualization 
The taxonomy of burden is broken down into the three sections: healthcare tasks, factors that exacerbate the burden of treatment, and consequences of healthcare tasks imposed on patients. These include personal, structural, financial, and emotional aspects of a patient's life.

Healthcare tasks

 Management of medications
Medication Intake
 Prepare and take drugs
 Plan and organize drug intake
 Follow specific precautions
 Organizing non-pharmacological treatment
 Store medication at home
 Refill medication stock
 Access/use equipment
 Plan/perform physical therapy
 Lifestyle changes
 Enact diet
 Force myself to eat some foods
 Eliminate some foods
 Plan and prepare meals
 Be careful of ingredients in meals
 Perform physical exercise
 Organize physical exercise
 Perform some physical activities
 Give up on some physical activities
 Change/organize sleep schedule
 Give up smoking
 Perform other lifestyle changes
 Follow-up
 Plan and organize self-monitoring
 Burden associated with tests
 Plan and organize lab tests
 Precautions before/when performing tests
 Burden associated with doctor visits
 Plan and organize doctor visits
 Remember questions to ask the doctor
 Organize transportation
 Organize formal caregiver care
 Paperwork tasks
 Take care of administrative paperwork
 Organize medical paperwork
 Understanding of the illness and treatment
 Learning about my condition or treatment
 Learn to navigate the healthcare system

Factors that exacerbate the burden of treatment

 Characteristics of treatment
 Nature
 Time required
 Frequency
 Structural Factors
 Access to resources
 Pharmacy does not have the medication in stock
 Access to lab test results
 Access to the right healthcare provider
 Distance from healthcare facilities
 Difficulty planning last-minute consultations
 No coordination between health providers
 Health center problems
 Parking near healthcare facilities
 Wait times
 Personal Factors
 Beliefs
 My treatment conflicts with some of my religious beliefs
 I feel dependent on my treatment
 I believe my treatment is inefficient
 I believe that some follow-up tasks are useless
 I believe that some consultations are useless
 I'm anxious about performing tests and their results
 Relationships with others
 Seeing other patients reminds me of what could happen to me
 I have to regularly explain my condition to others
 I hide my condition or treatment from others
 My loved ones don't help me with my condition/treatment
 My loved ones impose unnecessary precautions
 I feel that I'm a burden for others
 Relationships with healthcare providers
 For health care providers, I am a condition and not a person
 Healthcare providers neglect some problems for others
 Healthcare providers don't take into account my psychological problems
 I feel that healthcare providers don't trust what I tell them
 Healthcare providers don't explain things to me
 My physician doesn't take into account my context
 My physicians don't know about my condition/treatment
 Situational Factors
 Travels
 Access to structures or equipment when not at home
 Take medications when not at home
 Store medications when not at home
 Plan and organize travel
 Exceptional circumstances at home
 Follow my diet in the presence of other people
 Organize my diet to accommodate other people
 Changing physicians
 Pregnancy

Consequences of healthcare tasks imposed on patients

 Lack of adherence
 Non-intentional non-adherence
 Intentional non-adherence because of costs
 Intentional non-adherence because of complexity
 Development of strategies not to forget to take medications
 Impact on daily life
 Professional life
 Coping with judgement from others
 My healthcare activities interfere with my career
 Coping with absence from work
 Opportunity cost in professional life
 Social life
 Treatment interferes with leisure activities
 My healthcare activities interfere with my couple life
 Treatment interferes with family/friend commitments
 Emotional impact
 Treatment reminds me that I have a chronic condition
 Guilt associates with intentional non-adherence to treatment
 Frustration because of not being able to. to everything I want to
 Financial impact
 Indirect costs of treatment
 Direct costs of treatment

Personal and emotional factors

Medication, treatment, and appointment adherence 

Health literacy is a factor in adherence to medication and treatment as well as progress towards health goals. Language barriers, disabilities, and years of education play a role in health literacy. The competence a person has to assess, understand, and communicate health information frames a person's ability to process their disease and successfully self-manage it.  Medication self-management is a health promotion activity involving filling, understanding, organizing, taking, monitoring, and sustaining medications. Anything that hinders a person's ability to perform those tasks negatively impacts their adherence to medical instructions. Having multiple or constantly switching medications can complicate keeping track of what each medication is for and how to administer each one. Approximately a quarter of prescriptions for medications are never filled due to cost or a lack of understanding the necessity of the mediation.

The adherence to treatment and follow-up appointments involve having an effective plan, coordinated decision making, personal knowledge of signs and symptoms, management of functionality, and access to support services. Personal responsibilities such as work and family interfere with treatment and appointment adherence. The already existing conflict between work and family contributes to tardiness and a lack of attendance. These effects are exacerbated with additional commitments such as medical appointments and treatment. With inflexible work schedules, people can be in poor occupational standing for missing work for appointments regarding their own health or the health of a family member. Creating effective disease management requires a focus on cultural, personal, and situational aspects. Patients should be given information in a way that they can understand in order to integrate these treatments to improve their quality of life.

Lifestyle disruption: diet, exercise, substance use, and sleep 

Lifestyle medicine is prescribed to prevent and decrease the progression of chronic diseases. Unlike traditional medicine, lifestyle medicine focuses on behavior modification, making it an effective means of primary, secondary, and tertiary prevention. The interventions include nutrition, physical activity, sleep, and substance use.

Diet interventions are particularly difficult to implement into someone's life due to the interference with a biological drive: hunger. Nutrition improvements involve increasing low-energy dense foods and decreasing high-energy dense foods.  Food deserts, the availability of cheap, high-energy foods, and time scarcity all contribute to poor eating habits. For some households, parents do not have the time to prepare healthy meals on top of child care, work, and other responsibilities. Additionally, people with children may have difficulty implementing these changes because buying nutrient-poor foods can please their children and avoid food waste.

The prevalence of obesity in the United States continues to rise with a majority of American adults unable to meet the full set of physical activity guidelines. Prescriptions for exercise are given involving aerobic and/or resistance exercise. They usually involve performing 150 minutes a week of mild to moderate exercise or 75 minutes a week of vigorous exercise. Some reasons people do not exercise are because of negative emotions associated with exercise, lack of perceived control, and lack of purpose.

Substance use and substance use disorders reduce the life expectancy of those with NCDs, contributing to mental disorders, additional physical ailments (i.e. cirrhosis), injuries, and suicide. The process of quitting substance use involves uncomfortable withdrawal symptoms that can be hard to tolerate in especially stressful periods of time. Treatment strategies may require long-term treatment with multiple relapses.

Insufficient sleep and sleep disorders have been associated with chronic diseases and obesity. Some say sleep disorders may increase appetite, the desire for unhealthy foods, and hormone irregularities that affect satiation. Additionally, insufficient sleep leads to lethargy and in turn, decreased physical activity.

A new identity 
When someone is diagnosed with an NCD, there can be significant changes and sacrifices an individual must adjust to, depending on the nature of the disease. People can begin to experience a lack of purpose, isolation, and a loss of identity or culture after the diagnosis. Depression and anxiety are common in people with chronic disease, which can negatively effect a person's self management and worsen their disease. These conditions can impact social and occupational responsibilities. A person may also be struggling with ownership of their condition and may feel out of control. Different cultures can interpret conditions in various ways in terms of treatment, physiology, and symptoms. An individual's beliefs on their NCD can be interpreted in different ways based on their culture. The lifestyle a person lives is strongly influenced by the culture they live in, and changing it can make an individual feel like they are giving up on their culture's meaningful practices.  Addressing the mental health of patients with NCDs is helpful in accommodating their transition to living with an NCD.

Structural and financial factors

Management and coordination of healthcare staff and units 
Management and coordination of interprofessional collaborative practices is crucial in executing high quality and cost effective care. A challenge in managing healthcare is seamlessly coordinating care amongst different providers in order to coordinate across specialized units. Consultation meetings, responsibility designations, and protocols are essential of many ways to ensure communication and coordination. For patients, adequate management means shorter hospital stays, optimal care, resource availability, increased satisfaction, and lowered costs.

Physical accessibility 

Accessibility in healthcare can prevent a patient from receiving prompt and effective care. Geographical barriers contribute to the unequal distribution of providers and resources. This involves both poor physician-to-population ratios or unreachable physical distances to get to providers. Transportation is particularly challenging for those without vehicles who have to rely on public transportation. This leads to missed appointments and delayed care especially when prolonged medical attention is needed. Mobile health is a newer intervention being explored to increase the engagement and accessibility of medical care.

Socioeconomic status 
Those with lower socioeconomic status are vulnerable to engage in unhealthy behaviors, develop medical problems, and struggle accessing health care. Lower socioeconomic households are more likely to face overcrowding, lack of mobility, lack of basic amenities, and low health literacy. Those with lower socioeconomic status are more likely to witness violence in their neighborhood, have instability in their routines, and struggle with mental health due to emotional distress. Because of this, they are more likely to use substances and less likely to venture out of their home, engage in physical activity, eat healthily, and have a regular mealtime routine. Some of these households are non-white minorities, who can experience an additional linguistic barrier and lack of awareness of medical services. Non-white minorities can also experience deliberate or subconscious racism in healthcare on an institutional and personal level. These can lead to quicker diagnoses based on stereotypes as well as presumptions of lifestyle (i.e. drug abuse, intelligence level, etc). These assumptions have been associated with less preventative healthcare offered to them, such as screenings or vaccinations. Historical events such as the Tuskegee and Guatemala experiments have contributed to a lack of trust in healthcare, discouraging minorities from seeking medical assistance. These disadvantages prevent families from implementing healthy lifestyle changes that NCD treatment calls for.

Healthcare has become increasingly expensive as technology has advanced, giving those with a greater income an advantage of affording more healthcare. In countries that do not have universal health care such as the US, individuals who are under or uninsured are less inclined to get tests, treatments, etc. Over half of US adults have not being able to pay medical bills, delayed care because of cost, went underinsured at some point in their life, or are currently uninsured. People with lower socioeconomic status have increased financial uncertainties and multiple stressors, exacerbating their burden to access health care.

Future research 
Providers should be comfortable creating individualized interventions for their patients when implementing lifestyle changes. Motivational tactics have been explored to aid a patient's adherence to NCD lifestyle changes, but more interventions and research are needed. There are currently no studies that analyze the effect of introducing to the taxonomy of burden in health practices. There is also no standard to measure the quality of interactions between doctors and patients, with limited research on grading healthcare interactions beyond being "good" or "bad". There is also limited research on the effectiveness of online healthcare communities.

References

Health care